Kolkau was a subcamp of the German concentration camp Stutthof near Danzig during the Third Reich.

References 

Nazi concentration camps in Poland